Dani Who? is a Mexican teen drama thriller produced by Argos Comunicación for Viacom International Studios. The start of production was announced at the 2019 LA Screenings on May 15, 2019, and concluded on August 6, 2019. It premiered on the Paramount Channel Latin America on November 3, 2019, and concluded on January 5, 2020. The series became available via streaming services on Amazon Prime Video on November 8, 2019. The series revolves around a group of classmates who become accomplices to the disappearance of a girl, and stars Julia Urbini, Geraldine Galván, Lucía Tinajero, Yoshira Escárrega, and Meraqui Pradis. On May 19, 2020, it was confirmed that Nickelodeon reached an agreement with ViacomCBS International Studios to acquire the rights to the series and produce a podcast and a television series adapted to the same format.

Cast 
 Julia Urbini as Dani Márquez
 Yoshira Escarrega as Tamara Sánchez
 Geraldine Galván as Victoria Mata
 Lucía Tinajero as Olivia Valle
 Meraqui Pradis as Lorena Ibáñez
 Rodrigo Murray as Profesor Eric Vulch
 Mario Morán as JP
 Sergio Lozano as Sam Díaz
 Juan Carlos Colombo as Don Miguel
 Mario Loría as Germán Márquez
 Lourdes Reyes as Puri Ibáñez
 Carolina Miranda as Lluvia

References

External links 
 

Amazon Prime Video original programming
2019 Mexican television series debuts
Mexican television series
Spanish-language television shows